The 2020 Rhode Island House of Representatives elections took place as part of the biennial United States elections. Rhode Island voters will elect all 75 state representatives. State representatives serve two-year terms in the Rhode Island House of Representatives. A primary election was held on September 8, 2020 determined which candidates appear on the November 3 general election ballot. All the members elected will serve in the Rhode Island General Assembly.

Summary of results

Sources

Retiring incumbents
5 incumbent representatives (all Democrats) did not appear on the September 8 primary ballot

Joseph Almeida, District 12
Dennis Canario, District 36
Robert Jacquard, District 17
Michael Morin, District 49
Stephen Ucci, District 42

Defeated incumbents

In primary
6 incumbent representatives (all Democrats) sought reelection but were defeated in the September 8 primary. With the exception of Walsh, the defeated were all beaten by progressive challengers who saw the incumbents as too conservative for the Democratic party.

Raymond Johnston (D), District 61
Daniel P. McKiernan (D), District 7
Mario Mendez (D), District 13
Christopher Millea (D), District 16
Jose Serodio (D), District 64
Moira Walsh (D), District 3

In general election
Three incumbent representatives (two Democrats and an Independent) sought reelection but were defeated in the November 3 general election. Among them was House Speaker Nicholas Mattiello, who lost to Republican Barbara Ann Fenton-Fung.

James Jackson (D), District 26
John Lyle Jr. (I), District 46
Nicholas Mattiello (D), District 15

Predictions

Detailed results

District 1
No other candidate filed for District 1.

District 2
No other candidate filed for District 2.

District 3
Democratic primary

General election
No other candidate filed for District 3.

District 4

District 5

District 6

District 7
Democratic primary

General election
No other candidate filed for District 7.

District 8
Democratic primary

General election
No other candidate filed for District 8.

District 9

District 10
No other candidate filed for District 10.

District 11
Democratic primary

General election

District 12
Democratic primary

General election
No other candidate filed for District 12.

District 13
Democratic primary

General election
No other candidate filed for District 13.

District 14
No other candidate filed for District 14.

District 15

District 16
Democratic primary

General election

District 17
No other candidate filed for District 17.

District 18
No other candidate filed for District 18.

District 19
Democratic primary

General election

District 20
No other candidate filed for District 20.

District 21

District 22

District 23
No other candidates filed for District 23.

District 24
No other candidate filed for District 24.

District 25
No other candidate filed for District 25.

District 26

District 27
Democratic primary

General election
No other candidate filed for District 27.

District 28

District 29
No other candidate filed for District 29.

District 30

District 31
No other candidate filed for District 31.

District 32
No other candidate filed for District 32.

District 33
No other candidate filed for District 33.

District 34
No other candidate filed for District 34.

District 35
Democratic primary

General election
No other candidate filed for District 35.

District 36
No other candidate filed for District 36.

District 37

District 38
Democratic primary

General election

District 39

District 40

District 41
Democratic primary

General election

District 42

District 43
Democratic primary

General election

District 44
No other candidate filed for District 44.

District 45
No other candidate filed for District 45.

District 46

District 47
No other candidate filed for District 47.

District 48
No other candidate filed for District 48.

District 49

District 50
No other candidate filed for District 50.

District 51
No other candidate filed for District 51.

District 52

District 53

District 54
No other candidate filed for District 54.

District 55
No other candidate filed for District 55.

District 56
No other candidate filed for District 56.

District 57
No other candidate filed for District 57.

District 58
No other candidate filed for District 58.

District 59
No other candidate filed for District 59.

District 60
No other candidate filed for District 60.

District 61
Democratic primary

General election

District 62
No other candidate filed for District 62.

District 63
No other candidate filed for District 63.

District 64
Democratic primary

General election
No other candidate filed for District 64.

District 65
No other candidate filed for District 65.

District 66
No other candidate filed for District 66.

District 67
No other candidate filed for District 67.

District 68

District 69

District 70
General election

District 71
Democratic primary

General election

District 72
Democratic primary

General election

District 73
No other candidate filed for District 73.

District 74
Democratic primary

General election
No other candidate filed for District 74.

District 75

See also
2020 United States elections
2020 United States presidential election in Rhode Island
2020 United States Senate election in Rhode Island
2020 United States House of Representatives elections in Rhode Island
2020 Rhode Island Senate election

References

House
Rhode Island House
Rhode Island House of Representatives elections